Edoardo Agnelli (2 January 1892 – 14 July 1935) was an Italian entrepreneur and industrialist. He was the principal family shareholder of the Italian car company Fiat, as well as chairman of Juventus from 1923 until his death in 1935.

Early life 
Born in Verona, he was the son of Giovanni Agnelli (1866–1945), the founder of Fiat, and Clara Boselli (1869–1946). He married Virginia Bourbon del Monte (1899–1945), a Donna and daughter of Carlo del Monte, Prince of San Faustino, and his Kentucky-born wife Jane Allen Campbell.

Family 
Agnelli had seven children:
 Clara (1920–2016), wife of Prince Tassilo zu Fürstenberg, mother of Prince Egon von Fürstenberg and Princess Ira von Fürstenberg
 Gianni (1921–2003) 
 Susanna (1922–2009), wife of Count Urbano Rattazzi
 Maria Sole Agnelli (born 1925) 
 Cristiana (born 1927), wife of Count Brandolino Brandolini d'Adda 
 Giorgio Agnelli (1929–1965)  
 Umberto (1934–2004)

Agnelli's oldest son, Gianni Agnelli, was head of Fiat from 1966 to 2003, and made the company the most important in Italy and one of the major car builders of Europe. Agnelli's daughter, Susanna Agnelli, is the first woman to have been Italian Minister of Foreign Affairs. Into the 21st century, his grandson Andrea Agnelli became chairman of Juventus.

Sports 

Elected by the then assemblea di soci (membership assembly) as president of Italian association football club Juventus on 24 July 1923, this was a turning point. It coincided with the switch from amateur to professional football, which became, in the words of historian Aldo Agosti, "an indicator of the deepest transformations that take place in society, imposed from above by a mass system that the fascist regime tries to create." According to Agosti, "Juve, never truly aligned with the regime, at the time perhaps embodied a certain reactionary respectability, but showed intolerance of the showy, even vulgar displays of fascism, intercepted the change and laid the foundations for a solid club, up to today's Juve", which faced the European football changes. Upon being elected, Agnelli said: "I am grateful to you for welcoming my presidency as an honour, but I hope I will not disappoint you if I confess that I have no intention of considering it merely honorary. We must commit ourselves to doing well, but remembering that something done well can always be done better."

Agnelli became one of the most important directors in Juventus history, as well as of Italian football, and the one to whom credit can be given for transforming it from a club with local status to a national institution, as well as having started a series of sporting successes that turned it the Italy's most winning club in the 1950s during the administration of Umberto Agnelli, who was his son. Under his management, which lasted until Agnelli's death in 1935, the Turinese club established itself as a major force at national stage having won six Italian league championships of the only top flight competition in the country, including five in a row, being the first team to do so, a national record for the next 82 years until being broken by Andrea Agnelli's Juventus. It was also among the best continental sides during the interwar period reaching four consecutive Mitropa Cup semi-finals. His presidency is renowned as the beginning of the almost uninterrupted synergy between the football club and the Agnelli family, the oldest and longest-lasting in Italian sports, making Juventus one of the first professional sporting clubs ante litteram in the country.

Death 
Agnelli died in a plane accident on 14 July 1935, when he was returning from Forte dei Marmi in his father's seaplane, a Savoia-Marchetti SM.80 piloted by Arturo Ferrarin, en route to Genoa. The seaplane's floats bumped a wandering tree trunk, causing the plane to overturn. Agnelli died after being struck on the back of the head by the propeller; Ferrarin was uninjured.

See also 
 List of Juventus F.C. chairmen
 Professionalism in association football

Notes

References

Bibliography

External links 
 Descendants of Giovanni Agnelli and Clara Boselli at Hein's Royal Genealogy Page

1892 births
1935 deaths
Edoardo 2
Automotive businesspeople
Businesspeople from Turin
Businesspeople from Verona
Fiat people
Italian industrialists
Juventus F.C. chairmen and investors
Juventus F.C. directors
Victims of aviation accidents or incidents in 1935
Victims of aviation accidents or incidents in Italy